Goldammer is a surname. Notable people with the surname include:

Bruno Goldammer (1904–1968 or 1969), German footballer
Roger Goldammer (born 1969), Canadian motorcycle builder
Johann Goldammer (born 1949), senior scientist at the Max Planck Society for Chemistry, Biogeochemistry Department

See also
Goldhammer